Linda Elena Tovar is a Mexican-American actress. After leaving Mexico, Tovar moved to New York City and began appearing in off-Broadway shows, before working in television.

Career

Tovar is known for her recurring role as Rosalie Martinez on the ABC daytime soap opera General Hospital from 2014 to 2015. In 2015, she was nominated for a Daytime Emmy Award for Outstanding Special Guest Performer in a Drama Series for this role. She has appeared on Modern Family, CSI: NY, Criminal Minds, and NCIS: New Orleans.

In 2017, Tovar was cast in a recurring role as Iris Machado in The CW prime time soap opera reboot Dynasty.

In 2018, Tovar was cast in a recurring role in the third season of Netflix's Designated Survivor as Isabel Pardo.

Filmography

References

External links

American television actresses
American soap opera actresses
American actresses of Mexican descent
Living people
21st-century American actresses
Year of birth missing (living people)